Terebra vicdani is a species of sea snail, a marine gastropod mollusc in the family Terebridae, the auger snails.

Description

Distribution

References

 Kosuge S. (1981) Notes on newly recorded species of the superfamily Conacea from Philippines with descriptions of new species of the genera Terebra, Conus and Glyphostoma. Bulletin of the Institute of Malacology, Tokyo 1(6): 93–96, pls 31-32

External links
 Fedosov, A. E.; Malcolm, G.; Terryn, Y.; Gorson, J.; Modica, M. V.; Holford, M.; Puillandre, N. (2020). Phylogenetic classification of the family Terebridae (Neogastropoda: Conoidea). Journal of Molluscan Studies

Terebridae
Gastropods described in 1981